The Roseau Valley is a second-order subdivision in the island nation of St. Lucia.  It is home to the island's largest banana plantation.  The 2010 population of the Roseau Valley was 227.

Geography
The Roseau River runs through the valley and enters the sea at Roseau Bay. It is the longest river in St Lucia and the Roseau Reservoir is a major source of drinking water.

There are several settlements within the valley in the Anse la Raye District: 
Bois d'Inde,  
Coolietown village,  
Derrière Lagoon village,  
Jacmel village, 
Millet village, 
Morne Ciseaux second order subdivision, 
Morne d'Or second order subdivision, 
Pilori Point, 
Roseau Bay, 
Roseau Dam,  
Roseau village, 
Roseau Estate, 
Vanard second order subdivision,

Products
Originally the valley had been used for the cultivation of sugar and a railway (since been lifted) was used to transport the sugar from further up the valley to a processing plant at Roseau. Until the 1980s there was a thriving farmer's and fisherman's market at Roseau, but since then most people now travel to the market at Castries. More recently, it was a major production area for bananas. As of 2022, the fertile valley is being developed due to the local banana industry being out-competed by international contenders.

The Saint Lucia Distillers, Limited was located in Roseau in 1972. It has produced several prize-winning rums since .

See also
List of cities in Saint Lucia
List of rivers of Saint Lucia
Districts of Saint Lucia

References

Landforms of Saint Lucia
Subdivisions of Saint Lucia